Kyrshan Lyngshing (born 1987) is an Indian football player. He is currently playing for Shillong Lajong FC in the I-League as a midfielder.

Honours
Shillong Lajong
Indian Federation Cup runner-up: 2009–10

References

External links
 http://goal.com/en-india/people/india/29503/kyrshan-lyngshing
 http://www.indianfootball.com/en/statistic/player/detail/playerId/1225

Indian footballers
1987 births
Living people
Footballers from Arunachal Pradesh
Shillong Lajong FC players
Association football midfielders